A registered port is a network port designated for use with a certain protocol or application.

Registered port numbers are currently assigned by the Internet Assigned Numbers Authority (IANA) and were assigned by Internet Corporation for Assigned Names and Numbers (ICANN) before March 21, 2001, and were assigned by the Information Sciences Institute (USC/ISI) before 1998.

Ports with numbers 0–1023 are called system or well-known ports; ports with numbers 1024-49151 are called user or  registered ports, and ports with numbers 49152-65535 are called dynamic, private or ephemeral ports. Both system and user ports are used by transport protocols (TCP, UDP, DCCP, SCTP) to identify an application or service.

See also
 List of TCP and UDP port numbers

References

External links
   IANA's Official list of ports

Internet protocols